This article details the Canoeing at the 2012 Summer Olympics qualifying phase.
A new qualification system has been set up for both slalom and sprint canoeing at these games. The quotas were set for each event by the International Canoe Federation in July 2010.

Qualification summary

Slalom

For the slalom events, the men competed in C-1, C-2, and K-1. Women competed in K-1 only. Qualifications were allocated to NOCs, not to specific competitors.

Qualification timeline

Qualification table

Sprint

Qualification timeline

Qualification table
NOCs are limited to one boat per event, and in kayaking to 8 men and 6 women positions.
Qualification enables an NOC to participate, not necessarily in the person of the paddler who gained the qualification.
Quotas given are for boats.

 Host quota

 Italic: National federation has qualified a boat but the athlete that did this was already counted in another boat
 ^: ICF decided that two of the events in Oceania needed to be reattributed to the World Championships lists because the events seen as invalid due to lack of eligible competitors.

References

Qualification
Qualification for the 2012 Summer Olympics
Olympics qualification
Olympics qualification